This is a list of games released for the Game Boy Advance handheld video game system. This list does not include Game Boy Advance Video releases.

Every GBA game features the disclaimers "Only for Game Boy Advance" and "Not compatible with other Game Boy systems".

The Game Boy Advance is a handheld video game system developed by Nintendo and released during the sixth generation of video games.

The final game released for the Game Boy Advance was the North American localization of Samurai Deeper Kyo, which released as a bundle with a DVD set on February 12, 2008.

Games are listed with their abilities for multiplayer, when applicable. Multiplayer games between two or more Game Boy Advance systems require the appropriate Game Link Cable or Wireless Adapter. The table below shows the acronyms used.

See also
Game Boy Advance
Game Boy Advance SP
Game Boy Micro
Nintendo DS
List of best-selling Game Boy Advance games

References

Game Boy Advance
Game Boy Advance